The 2015 Ricoh Women's British Open was played 30 July – 2 August at the Trump Turnberry in South Ayrshire, Scotland. It was the 39th Women's British Open, and the 15th as a major championship on the LPGA Tour.

Inbee Park shot a final found 65 (−7) to win her first Women's British Open, three strokes ahead of compatriot Ko Jin-young, the 54-hole co-leader. It was Park's seventh major title and second of the season.

This was the second Women's British Open at Turnberry, which previously hosted 13 years earlier in 2002. As in 2002, it was played at par 72, with two par fours (3, 14) as par fives. ESPN2 and BBC Sport televised the event in the United States and the United Kingdom.

Course
 Ailsa Course

^ These par-4 holes (3, 14) are played as par-5 during this tournament.
 Women's British Open in 2002: , par 72
 The Open Championship in 2009: , par 70

Field
The field is 144 players, and most earn exemptions based on past performance on the Ladies European Tour, the LPGA Tour, previous major championships, or with a high ranking in the Women's World Golf Rankings. The rest of the field earn entry by successfully competing in qualifying tournaments open to any female golfer, professional or amateur, with a low handicap.

There were 17 exemption categories for the 2015 Women's British Open.

1. The top 15 finishers (and ties) from the 2014 Women's British Open.
Marina Alex, Laura Davies, Shanshan Feng (12), Julieta Granada, Charley Hull (9), Eun-Hee Ji, Jessica Korda, Stacy Lewis (9,11,12), Mo Martin (11), Azahara Muñoz, Gwladys Nocera (8), Anna Nordqvist (8), Inbee Park (8,12), Suzann Pettersen (12), Angela Stanford
Sun-Ju Ahn (9) did not play

2. The top 10 Ladies European Tour members in the Women's World Golf Rankings as of 30 June not exempt under (1).
Carlota Ciganda (3), Sandra Gal (3), Caroline Hedwall, Karine Icher, Ariya Jutanugarn (3), Caroline Masson, Catriona Matthew (3,11), Lee-Anne Pace, Beatriz Recari
Christel Boeljon (8) did not play

3. The top 30 LPGA Tour members in the Women's World Golf Rankings as of 30 June not exempt under (1).
Baek Kyu-jung, Chella Choi, Choi Na-yeon (8,12), Paula Creamer, Jang Ha-na, Cristie Kerr (8), Kim Hyo-joo (8,9,12), Kim Sei-young (8), Lydia Ko (8), Brittany Lang, Alison Lee, Ilhee Lee, Mi Hyang Lee, Minjee Lee (8), Brittany Lincicome (8,12), Pornanong Phatlum, Gerina Piller, Morgan Pressel, Ryu So-yeon (8,12), Lizette Salas, Jenny Shin, Lexi Thompson (12), Karrie Webb, Michelle Wie (12), Amy Yang (8)
Mirim Lee did not play

4. The top 25 on the current LET money as of 30 June not exempt under (1) or (2).
Beth Allen, Lucie Andre, Rebecca Artis, Isabelle Boineau, Amy Boulden, Anne-Lise Caudal, Ssu-Chia Cheng, Holly Clyburn, Nicole Garcia, Felicity Johnson, Stacey Keating, Nicole Broch Larsen, Camilla Lennarth, Xi Yu Lin, Nanna Koerstz Madsen, Florentyna Parker, Emily Kristine Pedersen, Titiya Plucksataporn, Pamela Pretswell, Melissa Reid (8), Marion Ricordeau, Marianne Skarpnord, Kylie Walker, Sally Watson, Ursula Wikström

5. The top 40 on the current LPGA Tour money list as of 30 June not exempt under (1) or (3).
Jacqui Concolino, Austin Ernst, Mina Harigae, Wei-Ling Hsu, Mi Jung Hur, Juli Inkster, Tiffany Joh, Moriya Jutanugarn, Danielle Kang, Kim Kaufman, Christina Kim, P.K. Kongkraphan, Candie Kung, Min Seo Kwak, Sydnee Michaels, Ai Miyazato, Mika Miyazato, Meena Lee, Pernilla Lindberg, Maria McBride, Haru Nomura, Park Hee-young, Jane Park, Paula Reto, Kelly Shon, Jennifer Song, Kelly Tan, Yani Tseng (11,12), Mariajo Uribe, Alison Walshe, Sakura Yokomine, Sun-Young Yoo (12)

6. The top five on the current LPGA of Japan Tour (JLPGA) money list as of 14 June not exempt under (1), (2), (3), or (13).
Misuzu Narita, Shiho Oyama, Ritsuko Ryu, Ayaka Watanabe, Yumiko Yoshida

7. The top two on the current LPGA of Korea Tour (KLPGA) money list as of 30 June not exempt under (1), (2), (3), or (6).
Chun In-gee (12), Ko Jin-young

8. Winners of any recognised LET or LPGA Tour events in the calendar year 2015.
Su-Hyun Oh

9. Winners of the 2014 LET, LPGA, JLPGA and KLPGA money lists.

10. Players ranked in the top 30 of the Women's World Golf Rankings as of 30 June, not exempt above.
Lee Jung-min, Teresa Lu (13)

11. Winners of the last 10 editions of the Women's British Open.
Jeong Jang, Lorena Ochoa, Jiyai Shin, Sherri Steinhauer did not play

12. Winners of the last five editions of the U.S. Women's Open, ANA Inspiration, and Women's PGA Championship, and the Evian Championship winners from 2013 and 2014.

13. Winner of the 2014 Japan LPGA Tour Championship Ricoh Cup.

14. The leading five LPGA Tour members upon completion of 36 holes in the 2015 Marathon Classic who have entered the Championship and who are not otherwise exempt.
Dewi Claire Schreefel, Sarah Kemp, Alena Sharp, Jenny Suh, Jaye Marie Green
Chie Arimura, Victoria Elizabeth did not play

15. The leading three LET members in the 2015 Aberdeen Asset Management Ladies Scottish Open, who have entered the Championship and who are not otherwise exempt.
Hannah Burke, Jade Schaeffer, Klára Spilková

16. The 2015 British Ladies Amateur champion, 2014 U.S. Women's Amateur champion, 2014 International European Ladies Amateur Championship champion, winner or next available player in the 2014 LGU Order of Merit, and the Mark H. McCormack Medal holder provided they are still amateurs at the time of the Championship and a maximum of two other leading amateurs at the discretion of the Ladies' Golf Union.
Céline Boutier (a), Kristen Gillman (a), Connie Jaffrey (a), Luna Sobrón Galmés (a)
Annabel Dimmock did not play
Minjee Lee, Mark H. McCormack Medal winner, turned pro in September 2014 forfeiting this exemption. She later qualified under categories 3 and 8.

17. Any players granted special exemptions from qualifying by the Championship Committee.
Natalie Gulbis, Brooke Henderson

18. Balance of the 90 LPGA Tour members
Katie Burnett

Qualifiers: Maria Balikoeva, Minea Blomqvist, Carly Booth, Charlotte Ellis, Georgia Hall, Nina Holleder, Rebecca Hudson, Vikki Laing, Chiara Mertens (a), Ashleigh Simon, Linnea Ström (a), Sophie Walker

Alternates: Stephanie Meadow – replaced Mirim Lee

Nationalities in the field

Past champions in the field

Made the cut

Missed the cut

Round summaries

First round
Thursday, 30 July 2015

Second round
Friday, 31 July 2015

Third round
Saturday, 1 August 2015

Final round
Sunday, 2 August 2015

Scorecard
Final round

Cumulative tournament scores, relative to par

Source:

References

External links

LPGA.com - Women's British Open - microsite
Ladies European Tour: Women's British Open
Ladies Golf Union: Women's British Open 

Women's British Open
Golf tournaments in Scotland
South Ayrshire
British Open
Women's British Open
Women's British Open
Women's British Open
21st century in South Ayrshire